Carmen Guaita Fernández (born San Fernando, Cádiz, 1960) is a Spanish writer and school teacher of philosophy.

Early life
Fernández was born in San Fernando but her family moved to Madrid.

Career
She is a member of several associations about arbitration and deontology, and of the NGO Delwende, which supports education projects. She also collaborates in different media like INED 21.

In 2019, she published the last book of her trilogy titled "Todo se olvida," which discussed forgiveness and Alzheimer's.

Works
Los amigos de mis hijos (2007)
 Contigo aprendí (2008) 
Desconocidas, una geometría de las mujeres (2009)
La flor de la esperanza (2010)
Memorias de la pizarra (2012)
Cartas para encender linternas (2012)
Jilgueros en la cabeza (2015)
Encuentros:Reflexiones y parábolas (2017)
Todo se olvida (2019)

References

External links
Blog

1960 births
Living people
Spanish educational theorists
Writers from Andalusia
21st-century Spanish women writers